The Orange County Register is a paid daily newspaper published in California. The Register, published in Orange County, California, is owned by the private equity firm Alden Global Capital via its Digital First Media News subsidiaries.

Freedom Communications owned the newspaper from 1935 to 2016.

History
The Register was founded by a consortium as the Santa Ana Daily Register in 1905. It was sold to J. P. Baumgartner in 1906 and to J. Frank Burke in 1927. In 1935 it was bought by Raymond C. Hoiles, who renamed it the Santa Ana Register. After the Japanese attack on Pearl Harbor, Hoiles was one of the few newspaper publishers in the country to oppose the forced relocation of Japanese and Japanese Americans to camps away from the West Coast.  Hoiles reorganized his holdings as Freedom Newspapers, Inc. In 1950, the name was changed to Freedom Communications. The paper dropped "Santa Ana" from its title in 1952.

In 1956, the newspaper was a prominent supporter of a vociferous campaign by anti-communists against the Alaska Mental Health Enabling Act, claiming that it was part of a Communist plot to establish concentration camps in Alaska. Circulation rose with the burgeoning population of Orange County and after the Register added a morning edition in 1959.

In 1970, Hoiles's sons, Clarence and Harry, became co-publishers until 1979, when R. David Threshie, Clarence's son-in-law, was named to the position.

1980s
Faced with an aggressive push into the county by the Los Angeles Times under publisher Otis Chandler, Threshie brought in 30-year-old N. Christian Anderson III as editor. Political positions were restricted to the editorial page. In 1981, the paper began publishing in full color.

In 1985, the paper assumed the name The Orange County Register. In the same year it won its first Pulitzer Prize, for its photographic coverage of the 1984 Summer Olympics in Los Angeles. It won additional Pulitzers in 1989 for beat reporting by Edward Humes on U.S. military problems with night-vision goggles and in 1996 for an investigation into Ricardo Asch's fertility clinics.

1990s
In 1990, the newspaper launched the 24-hour OCN news channel with news and feature stories about Orange County. It closed in 2001.

In 1992, Orange County Register Communications launched Excélsior, a Spanish-language weekly.  In 2010 Excélsior had a circulation of 51,000. It covers Orange County's growing Hispanic community, which now numbers over a million. Julio Saenz is the editor and general manager.

In 1994, Anderson was named publisher of Freedom’s second largest newspaper, the Colorado Springs Gazette. Managing editor Tonnie Katz was named to replace Anderson as editor of the Register. In 1999, Threshie became chairman of the board of Freedom Communication and Anderson returned to the Register as publisher and chief executive officer.

Ken Brusic was named vice president of content and executive editor in April 2002.

2000s:  Schism and bankruptcy
In 2003, a family schism led to the sale of a majority interest in Freedom Communications to investors led by the Blackstone Group and Providence Equity Partners. Through a stock arrangement, the Hoiles family descendants retained control of the board. The private equity firms received a management fee off the company’s gross revenue.

In 2006, Orange County Register Communications launched the OC Post, a tabloid with shortened versions of Register stories as well as news articles from the Associated Press.

The Register had its first significant staff reductions in December 2006, with 40 newsroom employees taking buyouts, along with a small number of layoffs.

By April 2007, The Orange County Register had made additional staff cuts to help maintain shareholder profit, which had averaged more than 20 percent annually in the preceding five years. 

Since the launch of the OC Post in 2006, OCRC had cut the Register's editorial staff by 10 percent and had frozen pay raises to editorial staff, which had averaged 3 percent annually, for six months. 

In September 2007, Terry Horne was named publisher of The Register. He came from the East Valley Tribune, a Freedom-owned suburban paper in the Phoenix area. He replaced N. Christian Anderson III as publisher.

In June 2008, KTLA, The Los Angeles Times and Fox News reported that the Register had begun a one-month trial of outsourcing some layout and copy-editing work to India to save costs. The trial was not deemed a success, and editing returned to Register 

In spring of 2009, Freedom Communications instituted furloughs for all employees nationwide, followed by a permanent 5% pay cut starting in July 2009. News reports in August 2009 indicated that Freedom Communications planned to file for bankruptcy and turn control of its publications, including The Orange County Register, over to its lenders.

In September 2009, a column written by sports columnist Mark Whicker caused controversy. In the column, Whicker wrote about various sporting events that had occurred over the preceding 18 years, and how they had been missed by Jaycee Dugard, a girl who had been kidnapped, raped, and forced to bear her kidnapper's children. Whicker ended his column with the line "Jaycee, you have left the yard." The column generated widespread criticism and was parodied in blogs such as Deadspin, who called it "the single worst piece of journalism ever committed on this page," and The Huffington Post.

2010s
On July 25, 2012, The Orange County Register and six other papers were purchased by 2100 Trust LLC. The papers continued to operate under the Freedom Communications name. In December the Register changed its logo and branding, dropping "The" in favor of Orange County Register.

A lawsuit was filed in October 2013 by the former owners of Freedom Communications against Aaron Kushner, principal of 2100 Trust, demanding that Kushner's company pay more than $17 million remaining on the sale. The Los Angeles Times wrote that Kushner, "a former greeting-card executive with no prior media experience," claimed that the prior owners had given him "inaccurate valuations for a host of crucial financial indicators" and that he faced "$62.3 million in unexpected financial liabilities as a result." On August 19, 2013, the Long Beach Register was launched as an edition of The Orange County Register serving the Long Beach, California, community. It was focused solely on community news, including city government, public and private education, local sports coverage, business and entertainment as an intended competitor to the Long Beach Press-Telegram. In addition, on January 20, 2014, The Press-Enterprise became an edition of The Orange County Register while maintaining coverage of the Inland Empire.

On April 16, 2014, The Orange County Register launched the Los Angeles Register, "more a print play than a digital one" serving Los Angeles County. It was the first time since the Herald-Examiner folded on November 1, 1989, that a main competitor to the Los Angeles Times was launched, this time intended to be "as local as one edition can be for the entire county." Five months later, Kushner announced in a company memo that the Los Angeles Register was ending publication effective immediately. Kushner wrote that "pundits and local competitors" will be quick to call the effort a failure while he believes that "not taking bold steps toward growth" would have been the true failure. The Long Beach Register became a Sunday-only publication in June 2014, and ceased publication in December 2014. In October the Los Angeles Times sued the Register for failing to pay more than $2 million to the Times for delivery services for the now-defunct Register newspapers in Los Angeles and Long Beach. In March 2014 the Los Angeles Superior Court granted the Times a $4.2 million writ of attachment to secure the ability of the Times to enforce a possible judgment in its favor.

On March 10, 2015, Aaron Kushner and his partner, Eric Spitz, resigned from executive duties at the paper and Freedom Communications Inc. The company was rumored to be readying itself for a potential sale. Publisher Rich Mirman, a former Las Vegas casino executive who had invested in Freedom, was announced as the new president and chief executive.

On February 12, 2016, Freedom Communications announced that The Orange County Register and the Press-Enterprise along with its websites, community weeklies and the two Spanish-Language weeklies Excelsior in Orange County and La Prensa in the Inland Empire, were being placed in a "stalking horse" auction after the company declared bankrupt at the end of 2015. Both Digital First Media and Tribune Publishing were the bidders. The auction started on March 21 and was completed on March 31, 2016. The U.S. Department of Justice blocked the sale of Freedom Communications to Tribune Publishing because it would create a newspaper monopoly in both Orange and Riverside Counties..On March 21, 2016, Digital First Media acquired both The Orange County Register and the Press-Enterprise for $52.3 million in a U.S. Bankruptcy Court in Santa Ana.  Los Angeles News Group was renamed Southern California News Group on March 31, 2016, once the sale of Freedom Communications to Digital First Media was completed. It has 11 paid regional dailies, and community weeklies serving the South Bay communities of Hermosa Beach, Redondo Beach and Palos Verdes Peninsula, the Long Beach neighborhoods north and east of downtown and over 20 community weeklies in Orange County, as well as the Spanish-language weeklies Impacto USA and Unidos, now consolidated as Excelsior, which will have three editions for Los Angeles County, Orange County and Inland Empire. On Sept. 21, 2016, it was announced that the Register would move its headquarters to 2190 Towne Centre Place, Anaheim, and vacate its longtime home at 625 N. Grand Ave., Santa Ana. The new headquarters opened April 24, 2017.

The Alliance for Audited Media reported in 2017 that the Register's circulation had dropped to 80,000 on weekdays and 180,000 on Sundays.

Editorial stances
The Register was notable for its generally libertarian-leaning editorial page. It generally supported free markets and social liberties, though at least some on the editorial board said they would not call it libertarian. Although it sometimes supported Republican politicians and positions, it was the largest newspaper in the country to have opposed the Iraq War from the beginning and opposed laws regulating issues such as prostitution and drug use. It was one of a handful of newspapers that opposed the internment of Japanese aliens and Japanese-Americans during World War II. It also opposed Proposition 8 in 2008, which proposed to define the word "marriage" in the California Constitution to mean between a man and a woman definitively. After the Digital First purchase of Freedom Communications, the Registers editorial page was merged with that of the Los Angeles Daily News and Digital First's other papers in the region to form a single editorial board for the Southern California News Group on regional and national issues.

Other publications
In addition to publishing The Orange County Register, Southern California News Group publishes OC Family magazine, Coast magazine, and the following affiliated weeklies:
 Anaheim Bulletin of Anaheim
 Coastal Current (North and South editions) of Newport Beach
 North County News Tribune of Fullerton
 Irvine World News of Irvine
 Laguna Woods Globe of Laguna Woods
 Saddleback Valley News of Lake Forest/Mission Viejo
 The Wave of Huntington Beach

Online content
On April 1, 2013, The Orange County Register began providing its online content through a metered paywall. Most online content required a subscription, with the exception of local weather, traffic, Associated Press or non-Register articles, and a few select local news articles.
As of October 2015, the website does not have a paywall and online content is free. As of May 2018, the paywall has been reinstated.

See also
 OC Weekly

References

External links
 
 Orange County Register Online Education (An Online Education Information Portal)
 OCExcelsior.com (sister publication) 
 Freedom Communications flagship profile of The Orange County Register

Daily newspapers published in Greater Los Angeles
Mass media in Orange County, California
Digital First Media
Pulitzer Prize-winning newspapers
Companies based in Santa Ana, California
Companies that filed for Chapter 11 bankruptcy in 2009
Companies that filed for Chapter 11 bankruptcy in 2015
Newspapers established in 1905
1905 establishments in California
Freedom Communications
Libertarian publications